Robert Zimmermann (6 September 1934 – 20 June 2012) was a Swiss bobsledder. He competed at the 1964 Winter Olympics and the 1968 Winter Olympics. He was also a stuntman, and worked on the James Bond film On Her Majesty's Secret Service.

References

1934 births
2012 deaths
Swiss male bobsledders
Olympic bobsledders of Switzerland
Bobsledders at the 1964 Winter Olympics
Bobsledders at the 1968 Winter Olympics
Sportspeople from Zürich
Swiss stunt performers
20th-century Swiss people